Bernard C. Parks (born December 7, 1943) is an American politician, who served as a member of the Los Angeles City Council, representing the 8th district in South Los Angeles from 2003 to 2015. A member of the Democratic Party, Parks served as Chief of the Los Angeles Police Department from August 1997 to May 2002.

Early life and education
Parks is a graduate of Daniel Murphy High School and attended Los Angeles City College and received a bachelor's degree from Pepperdine University. He earned a Master's Degree in public administration from the University of Southern California.

Career
During his tenure, the LAPD was rocked by a corruption and police brutality scandal involving the elite C.R.A.S.H. anti-gang unit of the Rampart Division in the overwhelmingly Latino Pico-Union and Westlake districts. The Police Commission, under Commission President Rick J. Caruso did not recommend Parks for reappointment as police chief. Parks was succeeded as chief by William Bratton.

In 2003, Parks won the seat on the Los Angeles City Council for Council District 8 representing South Los Angeles. He also unsuccessfully ran for the post of mayor in the 2005 elections, coming fourth in the primary.  In 2008, Parks unsuccessfully sought to succeed Yvonne Brathwaite Burke on the Los Angeles County Board of Supervisors, losing to Mark Ridley-Thomas in a runoff election. Term limits forced Parks out of the city council office in 2015. Marqueece Harris-Dawson won the District 8 election for the vacant seat, and replaced Parks on 1 July 2015.

References

External links
 Alex Alonzo, "It's Not About Crime and Never Was: Bernard Parks' ouster as LAPD Chief, Streetgangs.com, April 12, 2002
 "Bernard Parks' record as LAPD chief and city councilman is a mixed blessing in his race for L.A. County supervisor"--LA Times
 Gillian Wolf, "Bernard C. Parks," Gale Contemporary Black Biography

1943 births
Living people
African-American police officers
American police officers
African-American people in California politics
California Democrats
Los Angeles City College alumni
Los Angeles City Council members
Chiefs of the Los Angeles Police Department
People from Beaumont, Texas
Pepperdine University alumni
USC Sol Price School of Public Policy alumni
21st-century African-American people
20th-century African-American people
Candidates in the 2005 United States elections